Koht is a Norwegian surname that may refer to
Halvdan Koht (1873–1965), Norwegian historian and politician 
Karen Grude Koht (1871–1960), Norwegian educationalist, essayist and feminist pioneer
Paul Koht (1913–2002), Norwegian diplomat
Paul Steenstrup Koht (1844–1892), Norwegian educator and politician

Norwegian-language surnames